Hermann Kiese (1865–1923)  was a German rosarian known for his breeding of rose cultivars.
Born in Vieselbach, Thuringia, Germany on May 8, 1865. He worked for 22 years as gardener for the Johann Christoff Schmidt rosarium in Erfurt. In 1904 he started his own nursery in Vieselbach near Erfurt.
Hermann Kiese is one of the founders of the Verein Deutscher Rosenfreunde – VDR (Union of German Friends of Roses).  From 1911 to 1916 he was chief editor of the magazine Rosen-Zeitung. Consequently, he shared this responsibility with Friedrich Ries till 1919.

Hermann Kiese died on September 22, 1923 

He specialized in hybrid Polyanthas and Climbing Roses, but introduced some Hybrid Teas.
Among his numerous creations are:

 Leuchtstern (1899),
 Lohengrin (1903),
 Blumenschmidt (1906),
 Tausendschön (1906),
 Kronprinzessin Cecilie (1907),
 Otto von Bismarck (1908),
 Eisenach (1909),
 Veilchenblau (1909),
 Kiese (1910),
 Weisse Tausendschön (1910),
 Deutschland (1910),
 Hermann Lüder (1910)',
 Lilli von Posern (1910),
 Lisbeth von Kamecke (1910),
 Nordlicht (1910),
 Perle von Britz (1910),
 Stadtrat Glaser (1910),
 Wartburg (1910),
 Andreas Hofer (1911),
 Gräfin Chotek (1911),
 Frau Anna Lautz (1912),
 Paula Clegg (1912),
 Andenken an Breslau (1913),
 Grossherzogin Feodora von Sachsen (1913),
 Hackeburg (1913),
 Loreley (1913),
 Ludwig Möller (1915),
 Siegesperle (1915),
 Hindenburg (1916),
 Dannenberg (1916),
 Admiral Tirpitz (1918),
 Gruß an Frankfurt (1918),
 Freudenfeuer (1918),
 Fürst Leopold IV zu Schaumburg-Lippe (1918),
 Gertrud Kiese (1918),
 Fliegerheld Öhring (1919),
 Deutsche Hoffnung (1919),
 Heldengruß (1919),
 Gruß am Weimar (1919),
 Rudelsburg (1919),
 Schön Ingeborg (1921),
 Käthchen von Heilbronn (1922),
 Louis Kahle (1922),
 Vater Rhein (1922),
 Perle von Hohenstein (1923),
 Frau Prof. Gnau (1925),
 Kleine Ech (1925),
 Weiße Echo (1925),

After his death, following cultivars have been attributed to Hermann Kiese:

 Märchen (1927),
 Martin Liebau (1930)

Rosarian Philipp Geduldig named a cultivar "Hermann Kiese" in 1906 to honor the rose-breeder.

References

Notes

Bibliography

German horticulturists
Rose breeders
German gardeners
1865 births
1923 deaths